Wild League may refer to:

 Wild League (film), a 2019 Russian historical sports drama film
 Wild League (water polo), an amateur water polo competition in Croatia